Morten Skallerud (born 14 July 1954) is a Norwegian cinematographer and film director. He runs Camera Magica, a film production company in Oslo.

He won the Amanda Award for Best Short Film with 1991's A Year Along the Abandoned Road.

Released films
A Year Along the Abandoned Road, 1991 12 minutes
Ti tusen år under jorda, 1995
Arktisk lys 32 minutes
Nordlyset danser 8:30 minutes
Smale spor av et århundre, 2003 4:30 minutes

External links
Camera Magica

1954 births
Living people
Norwegian film directors